El refugio is a Mexican telenovela produced by Ernesto Alonso for Telesistema Mexicano in 1965.

Cast 
Ofelia Guilmáin
Aarón Hernán
Fanny Schiller
José Carlos Ruiz

References

External links 

Mexican telenovelas
1965 telenovelas
Televisa telenovelas
Spanish-language telenovelas
1965 Mexican television series debuts
1965 Mexican television series endings